Kenneth Mackenzie, 1st Earl of Seaforth FRS (15 January 1744 – 27 August 1781) was a British peer, politician, soldier  and Chief of the Highland Clan Mackenzie.

Origins
Mackenzie was the son of Kenneth Mackenzie, Lord Fortrose (died 1761) by Mary, the eldest daughter of Alexander Stewart, 6th Earl of Galloway. His paternal grandfather was the attainted William Mackenzie, 5th Earl of Seaforth, whose estates he repurchased from the government. The Earls of Seaforth descended from the ancient family of Mackenzie of Kintail.

Career
Mackenzie was created Viscount Fortrose and Baron Ardelve in the Peerage of Ireland on 18 November 1766. He was a Member of Parliament for Caithness from 1768 to 1774. On 3 December 1771, he was created Earl of Seaforth (a new peerage, also in the Peerage of Ireland).

On 12 November 1772, Mackenzie was elected a Fellow of the Royal Society.

As an act of gratitude for the favours he had received, Mackenzie raised a regiment, the 78th Seaforth (Highland) Regiment, serving as its Lieutenant Colonel Commandant from 29 December 1777. In June 1781 he sailed with the regiment when it embarked for India, but on 27 August 1781 he died on the journey and was buried at sea. He was succeeded as Lieutenant-Colonel Commandant by his cousin Thomas Frederick Mackenzie Humberston.

On his death his Irish earldom became extinct. He was succeeded as Chief of the Clan Mackenzie by his cousin Thomas Frederick Mackenzie Humberston.

Family
Mackenzie married first Lady Caroline Stanhope (1747–1767), daughter of William Stanhope, 2nd Earl of Harrington by whom he had one daughter, Lady Caroline Mackenzie (1766–1847), who married  (d. 1833) and had children.
He married secondly Harriet Powell, or Lamb (died 11 December 1779), the daughter of an apothecary. Sir James Balfour Paul describes her tactfully as "a fashionable beauty of the town", but Horace Bleackley is rather more explicit:
The graceful Harriet Powell, equally frail and famous, whose winsome face was portrayed in many a mezzotint, had spent her early youth as an inmate of Mrs Hayes's disreputable establishment in King's Place, but now at last she had become faithful to one man, and was keeping house with Lord Seaforth, the creator of a famous regiment.

Reputation
Seaforth's biographer has summarised him as:
...a dandy, musician and connoisseur, an adventurer and lady's man, Chief of his Clan, and founding Colonel of his own regiment. A child of the Enlightenment, he delighted in its achievements and greater freedoms – and took full advantage of both. But he was born with too great a sense of entitlement and too little sense of responsibility, and he never found any firm purpose in life.

References

|-

1744 births
1781 deaths
British MPs 1768–1774
Earls in the Peerage of Ireland
Fellows of the Royal Society
Members of the Parliament of Great Britain for Scottish constituencies
Kenneth
72nd Highlanders officers
Seaforth, Kenneth Mackenzie, 4th Marquess of
Peers of Ireland created by George III
Seaforth Highlanders officers
People who died at sea
Earls of Seaforth